ECMC may refer to:

 Erie County Medical Center, a hospital located in Buffalo, New York
 European Cycle Messenger Championships
 Educational Credit Management Corporation